WSTQ may refer to:

 WSTQ (FM), a radio station (97.7 FM) licensed to Streator, Illinois, United States
 WSTQ-LP, a defunct low-power television station (channel 14 (cable 6)) formerly licensed to Syracuse, New York, United States